Philip Barber may refer to:

Major Philip Hedley Barber, see 2006 New Year Honours
Sir Philip Barber, 1st Baronet (1876–1961) of the Barber Baronets
Phil Barber (born 1965), English footballer

See also
Barber (disambiguation)